Norman Yemm (23 March 1933 – 3 February 2015) was an Australian actor, opera singer and sportsman.

Screen career (Film and TV)

Yemm's film roles include Night of Fear and The Fourth Wish

On the small screen he may be best remembered for his long-running role in the television drama The Sullivans as Norm Baker. He had previously played regular roles in Homicide as Detective Jim Patterson and Number 96 as Harry Collins. 

Further TV credits include Prisoner as police officer Eddie Stevens, Division 4, Matlock Police, Riptide, Tandarra, A Country Practice, Possession, Neighbours, The Henderson Kids, Blue Heelers and Something in the Air. 
.

Theatre
Yemm appeared in such roles as Don Pasquale], he was a frequent performer in musical theatre including roles in  Oklahoma and The Pirates of Penzance, South Pacific and The Sound of MusicAs a vocalist he had spent years as chief baritone with Opera Australia.

 Sporting achievements 
Norman was a professional track athlete for most of his adult life, winning 96 finals, including three races at the Stawell Gift. Yemm was also an Australian rules footballer, having played for Victorian Football Association (VFA) club Port Melbourne.

Personal life
Norman Yemm was born in 1933 in Elsternwick, Victoria. He has an identical twin brother, Gordon, who is a professional musician and shares Norman's success on the track and as a performer.

"An actor's greatest attribute is to have a good memory, but I've always had a bad one." That didn't stop him from working that much harder to remember his lines on stage and screen, and it was some old-fashioned blood, sweat and tears that brought the brothers their success. He has three children; his daughter Jodie Yemm is an actress.

Death
Yemm died on 3 February 2015, aged 81, and his death was announced two days later.

Discography
Singles

Filmography
 Film 

 Television 

References

Sources
 Atkinson, G. (1982) Everything you ever wanted to know about Australian rules football but couldn't be bothered asking'', The Five Mile Press: Melbourne; .

External links
 Profile, mednwh.unimelb.edu.au; accessed 18 February 2015.
 Interview, Classic Australian Television, Interview Norman Yemm

Australian male television actors
1933 births
2015 deaths
Australian rules footballers from Melbourne
Port Melbourne Football Club players
Male actors from Melbourne
Singers from Melbourne
People from Elsternwick, Victoria
Athletes from Melbourne